The dotara (or dotar) Persian ( dûtûra,  dotora, literally, 'Of or having two strings') is a two, four, or sometimes five-stringed musical instrument, originating from Iran and Central Asia. It is commonly used in Bangladesh, where it serves as the national instrument and the Indian states of Assam, West Bengal and Bihar. It was mentioned in a 14th-century Saptakanda Ramayana. Later, it was adopted by the ascetic cults of Bauls and Fakirs.

Etymology
The term is from Eastern Indo-Aryan (do târ), literally "two wires", with the suffix -a “having, -ed”. The instrument is known as dotara or dütara and dütüra.Technically it is called Dotara because the middle two of its strings are tuned in same note.

History 
Madhava Kandali, 14th century Assamese poet and writer of Saptakanda Ramayana, lists several instruments in his version of "Ramayana", such as Dotara, mardala, tabal, jhajhar etc.

Variations 
The dotara is one of the most important instruments used in various genres of folk music in Bengal and Assam. It has two main forms, the Bangla and the bhawaiya (Assamese form). The Bangla form originated in the Rahr Bangla region, where it is still predominantly played. It has metal strings, which give it a brighter tone than other instruments played in the area. Although a dotara can have 4-5 strings, most playing is done primarily on two strings, hence the name.

The bhawaiya form is almost extinct in contemporary times, that has a more primeval beginning than its bangla cousin. Again the strings are its striking feature, being made either of thick cotton, silk or more popularly of catgut, giving it a more bass-rich tone. This instrument is widely used in eastern folk music forms such as the Bhhawaiya - of which the Goalpariya is a relatively well-known subcategory - the Mahishali and the Baul forms prevailing in and around the Bengal Province, including areas in East Bihar.

Construction 
The dotara is a plucked stringed instrument, played in an open note combination, often played alongside folk percussive instruments such as Dhol, Khhol or Mandira. It is made out of neem or other hardwood, with an elongated, roundish belly for a soundbox, which tapers to a narrow neck culminating in a peg box which is often elaborately carved in the shape of a peacock-head, swan-head or other animal motifs. The fingerboard is fretless and made of brass or steel, as in a sarod. The soundbox of the instrument is covered with a tightly stretched kidskin or lizard-skin, as in a rabaab or a sarod.

Tuning 
With four strings, the dotara is tuned as follows (from top to bottom)—Soh (lower)-Do-Do-Fah. The Indian notation would read: Pa - Sa - Sa - Ma with Do/Sa being the tonic/root note of the song.

See also 
 Dutar
 Sarod

References

External links
 

Necked bowl lutes
Drumhead lutes
Bangladeshi musical instruments
Indian inventions